Khreschatyk may refer to:

 Khreschatyk, the main street in Kyiv, Ukraine
 Khreshchatyk (Kyiv Metro), one of the oldest Kyiv Metro stations
 Khreschatyk (magazine), from Ukraine

Kyiv's best-known street gave its name to many literary works, commercial enterprises and products.